Bessie Beatrice Carter (born 25 October 1993) is an English actress. She is known for her role as Evie Wilcox on the BBC television series Howards End (2017) and Violet Woodhouse on the ITV television series Beecham House (2019).

Early life
Carter was born in Westminster to actors Imelda Staunton and Jim Carter. In 2007, the three appeared in the BBC series Cranford (Carter was Captain Brown, Staunton was Miss Octavia Pole and Bessie was the maid, Margaret Gidman).

She initially attended Francis Holland School before moving to Camden School for Girls, a state school, where she completed her A Levels. She took a year out, during which she auditioned for drama school. She studied at the Guildhall School of Music and Drama, graduating in 2016 and winning the Spotlight Prize for Best Screen Actor that same year.

Filmography

Film

Television

Stage

References

External links
 

1993 births
Living people
20th-century English actresses
21st-century English actresses
Actresses from London
Alumni of the Guildhall School of Music and Drama
English film actresses
English people of Irish descent
English stage actresses
English television actresses
People educated at Camden School for Girls
People educated at Francis Holland School
People from Westminster